Pseudoleucania leucaniiformis is a moth of the family Noctuidae. It is found in the Biobío and Araucanía Regions of Chile, Bolivia and San José and Tucumán in Argentina.

The wingspan is 32–35 mm. Adults are on wing from December to January.

External links
 Noctuinae of Chile

Noctuinae